Trøgstad is a municipality in Østfold county, Norway.  The administrative centre of the municipality is the village of Skjønhaug.  The municipality is divided into the parishes of Skjønhaug, Havnås and Båstad.  The parish of Trygstad was established as a municipality on 1 January 1838 (see formannskapsdistrikt).

The scene of the crime for the World War II-era Feldmann case is at Skrikerudtjernet in Trøgstad.

General information

Name
The municipality (originally the parish) is named after the old Trøgstad farm (Old Norse: Þrygsstaðir and/or Þrjúgsstaðir), since the first church was built here. The meaning of the first element is not known (maybe a male nickname) and the last element is staðir which means "homestead" or "farm". Prior to 1889, the name was written "Trygstad".

Coat-of-arms
The coat-of-arms is from modern times.  They were granted on 24 August 1979.  The arms show an anvil and was chosen because Trøgstad historically was well known for the quality of its blacksmiths what made iron tools and objects. The green background of the shield symbolizes the fields and forests in the municipality.  The arms were designed by Truls Nygaard.
(See also coat-of-arms of Hol)

Trøgstad Church
Trøgstad Church (Trøgstad kirke) is a medieval era, stone church. It belongs to Østre Borgesyssel  deanery in Diocese of Borg. The church is located on a ridge south of Øyeren. The church is of Romanesque architecture and has a rectangular nave with a lower and narrower choir.

The church is probably built ca. 1250.  It  was the equipped with turret with a bell tower ca. 1620. This had to be demolished and replaced with a new tower in 1700.  A sacristy was built by the choir's north face in 1697.  In 1904 the church was extended and rebuilt, the western wall and the porch were demolished and choir was extended. After rebuilding the church has approximately 350 seats.

Notable people

Minorities

Sister cities
Trøgstad has the following sister cities:
 - Kadrina, Lääne-Viru, Estonia
 - Kinnula, Länsi-Suomen lääni, Finland
 - Robertville, New Brunswick, Canada

References

External links

Municipal fact sheet from Statistics Norway

 
Municipalities of Viken (county)